Marshland, formerly known as Skunk Cabbage Flat, is an unincorporated community in Columbia County, Oregon, United States. It was settled by Z.B. Bryant in 1862. Its post office was established around 1873. It closed in 1960.

References 

Unincorporated communities in Columbia County, Oregon
1873 establishments in Oregon
Populated places established in 1873
Unincorporated communities in Oregon